BloomNation is an American online floral marketplace with about 3,500 florists delivering to nearly 5,000 cities across the country.  As an “Etsy-type” site for flowers, customers connect directly with local florists whose flower arrangements are highlighted in the marketplace. The florists upload their own real photos of their floral design as no stock catalog images are allowed.  In the marketplace, customers can browse flower arrangements and reviews from participating florists all in one place.

History 

BloomNation is headquartered in Los Angeles, California and was founded by David Daneshgar, Farbod Shoraka and Gregg Weisstein in 2011.   The original concept of a marketplace for florists was developed by Farbod after hearing the struggles of his aunt, who is a local florist. The business plan was developed at the University of Chicago, Booth School of Business where Daneshgar, Shoraka, and Weisstein won the university's New Venture Challenge. Initial seed funding was obtained when Daneshgar, a former World Series of Poker champion, won a two-day poker tournament in Los Angeles.  This gave the company enough funding to create a beta version of the marketplace and establish proof of concept.

BloomNation was the first national floral website to accept bitcoin. They offer customers a "BloomSnap", a feature where the florist sends the customer a photo of the completed arrangement before it goes out for delivery.

Funding 

BloomNation raised $1.65 million in seed funding. The round was led by Chris Dixon at Andreessen Horowitz and included participation from Spark Capital, Chicago Ventures and CrunchFund.

In October 2014, BloomNation raised an additional $5.55 million series A round from Ronny Conway, Andreessen Horowitz, Spark Capital, Chicago Ventures and Crunchfund. The additional resources will help the company expand its curated network of florists, introduce a wedding/event service and launch a mobile app.

References 

Florist companies
2011 establishments in California
Companies based in Los Angeles